The 1967 Star World Championships were held in Skovshoved, Copenhagen, Denmark in 1967.

Results

References

Star World Championships
1967 in sailing
Sailing competitions in Denmark